Harkness is a Scottish surname. Its etymology is probably from the Old English personal name Hereca (a derivative of the various compound names with the first element here army) plus the  Old English næss headland, cape.  The  name is first recorded along the Cumbrian border (1350).  By the 15th century they were firmly established in Nithsdale area of Dumfriesshire.  James Harkness of Locherben led the rescue in 1684 of a group of Covenanters who were being taken for trial in Edinburgh.  For this act his brother was hanged the following year.

Tartans 
There are two tartans that are recognized for the Harknesses of Nithsdale clan. One is the traditional red, and the other is the "ancient" blue. Both tartans were created by Harvey Harkness Rulien in 1982.

Family name 
People with the surname include:
Shaun Harkness - an English Mechanical engineer and Landscaping and fencing specialist 
Alistair Harkness - an Australian politician
Anna M. Harkness - an American philanthropist
Anthony Harkness - an American inventor
Charles W. Harkness - heir to Standard Oil fortune and namesake of Harkness Tower at Yale University
Daniel Harkness - an American university professor
Daniel M. Harkness - an American businessman and early Standard Oil investor
Deborah Harkness - Author and historian
Douglas Harkness - a Canadian politician
Edward Harkness - an American philanthropist
Georgia Harkness - an American Christian theologian
H. W. Harkness – an American mycologist and natural historian
Hilary Harkness – an American painter
James Harkness (disambiguation)
Jerry Harkness (1940–2021), American basketball player
John Granville Harkness - a British major-general
Kenneth Harkness - manager of the United States Chess Federation
Lamon V. Harkness - an American businessman,  heir to Standard Oil fortune and important Standardbred horse breeder
Nancy Harkness Love - an American pilot
Ned Harkness - a college and NHL coach
Rebekah Harkness - founder of the Harkness Ballet
Robert Harkness - an English geologist
Ruth Harkness - American fashion designer and socialite who brought the first giant panda to the western world
Stephen V. Harkness - best friend and business partner of John D. Rockefeller
William L. Harkness - heir to Standard Oil fortune
Steven D. Harkness - founder of American Tank Wash Partners, first food grade tank wash franchise, worldwide

Fictional characters with the name
Agatha Harkness - a witch in the Marvel Comics universe
Horace Harkness - a naval officer in the 'Honorverse'
Captain Harkness - Captain of the torchship Mayflower in Farmer in the Sky, by Robert A. Heinlein
Captain Jack Harkness, one of the main protagonists in the fictional television series Torchwood and a companion of the television series Doctor Who
George "Digger" Harkness aka Captain Boomerang - a supervillain from the DC Comics universe
Harkness - Rivet City security officer in the video game Fallout 3
Gary Harkness - University student and football player in Endzone, novel by Don DeLillo

See also
 Jack Harkness (disambiguation)
 John Harkness (disambiguation)

References
 Ancestry.com name meaning

Surnames